Fladda is one of the Slate Islands, off the west coast of Argyll and Bute, Scotland.

Fladda is an islet in the Sound of Luing, between Luing and Belnahua. The name Fladda originates from the Old Norse for 'flat island'.

Lighthouse
The tower is painted white, the lantern is black and has ochre trim; it is a minor light operated by Northern Lighthouse Board but managed privately. The light emits a two white flashes every 9 seconds.
The keeper's house seems to be home to a large colony of terns.

See also
 List of lighthouses in Scotland
 List of Northern Lighthouse Board lighthouses

References

External links
 Northern Lighthouse Board

Uninhabited islands of Argyll and Bute